Portugal competed at the 2012 Summer Olympics, held in London, from 27 July to 12 August 2012. The nation celebrated its centennial anniversary participating in the Olympics, having participated at every Summer edition since 1912. The Olympic Committee of Portugal sent a total of 77 athletes to the Games, 45 men and 32 women, to compete in 13 sports. Despite having the same number of athletes as in Beijing, Portugal did not qualify any athletes in archery, fencing and taekwondo.

Thirty-eight of the Portuguese athletes had competed in Beijing, including sailor Gustavo Lima, who had finished fourth in men's Laser class, and race walker Ana Cabecinha, who had set a national record for her sporting event. Windsurfer and multiple-time European champion João Rodrigues became the first Portuguese athlete to compete in six Olympic games. Meanwhile, former middle-distance runner Luís Feiteira made his Olympic comeback in London to compete in the men's marathon after a sixteen-year absence. Pistol shooter João Costa, at age 47, was the oldest athlete on the team, while breaststroke swimmer Ana Rodrigues was the youngest at age 18. Judoka Telma Monteiro, who claimed two titles each in World Cup, and in the European championships, became Portugal's first female flag bearer at the opening ceremony since 1996.

Portugal left London with only a silver medal, won by sprint kayak pair Emanuel Silva and Fernando Pimenta. This was considered the nation's worst Olympic games since 1992, following poor performances by the athletes, and the absence of former Olympic medalists from the team due to injuries. Notable absences included the defending champion Nelson Évora in the men's triple jump, triathlete Vanessa Fernandes, former medalists Francis Obikwelu and Rui Silva, and long jumper Naide Gomes.

Medalists

Athletics 

The following athletes have achieved qualifying standards in athletics events (up to a maximum of three athletes per event with the 'A' Standard, and one athlete per event with the 'B' Standard):

Key
 Note – Ranks given for track events are within the athlete's heat only
 Q = Qualified for the next round
 q = Qualified for the next round as a fastest loser or, in field events, by position without achieving the qualifying target
 NR = National record
 N/A = Round not applicable for the event
 Bye = Athlete not required to compete in round

Men
Track & road events

Field events

Women
Track & road events

Field events

Badminton

Canoeing 

Men

Women

Qualification Legend: FA = Qualify to final (medal); FB = Qualify to final B (non-medal)

Cycling

Road

Mountain biking

Equestrian

Dressage

Jumping

Gymnastics

Artistic
Men

Women

Trampoline

Judo

Rowing 

Men

Qualification legend: FA=Final A (medal); FB=Final B (non-medal); FC=Final C (non-medal); FD=Final D (non-medal); FE=Final E (non-medal); FF=Final F (non-medal); SA/B=Semifinals A/B; SC/D=Semifinals C/D; SE/F=Semifinals E/F; QF=Quarterfinals; R=Repechage

Sailing 

Men

Women
Fleet racing

Match racing

Open

M = Medal race; EL = Eliminated – did not advance into the medal race;

Shooting 

Men

Women

Swimming 

Portuguese swimmers have achieved qualifying standards in the swimming events (up to a maximum of two swimmers per event with the Olympic Qualifying Time (OQT), and potentially one with the Olympic Selection Time (OST)):

Men

Women

Table tennis

Triathlon 

Portugal qualified two triathletes for the men's event.

Notes

References 

Nations at the 2012 Summer Olympics
2012
Summer Olympics